Riverview is a village in St. Louis County, Missouri, United States. The population was 2,397 at the 2020 census.

Geography 
Riverview is located at  (38.746400, -90.212146).

Demographics

2010 census
As of the census of 2010, there were 2,856 people, 1,125 households, and 700 families residing in the village. The racial makeup of the village was 27.0% White, 69.9% African American, 0.2% Native American, 0.3% Asian, 0.4% from other races, and 2.2% from two or more races. Hispanic or Latino of any race were 0.7% of the population.

There were 1,125 households, of which 36.6% had children under the age of 18 living with them, 25.2% were married couples living together, 29.7% had a female householder with no husband present, 7.3% had a male householder with no wife present, and 37.8% were non-families. 31.9% of all households were made up of individuals, and 6.4% had someone living alone who was 65 years of age or older. The average household size was 2.54 and the average family size was 3.21.

The median age in the village was 31.6 years. 29.1% of residents were under the age of 18; 11.1% were between the ages of 18 and 24; 26.5% were from 25 to 44; 25.1% were from 45 to 64; and 8.2% were 65 years of age or older. The gender makeup of the village was 47.6% male and 52.4% female.

2000 census
In 2000 there were 1,331 households, out of which 31.6% had children under the age of 18 living with them, 32.9% were married couples living together, 21.1% had a female householder with no husband present, and 40.7% were non-families. 34.5% of all households were made up of individuals, and 9.7% had someone living alone who was 65 years of age or older. The average household size was 2.35 and the average family size was 3.03.

In the village, the population was spread out, with 27.7% under the age of 18, 9.8% from 18 to 24, 32.4% from 25 to 44, 17.7% from 45 to 64, and 12.4% who were 65 years of age or older. The median age was 33 years. For every 100 females, there were 91.8 males. For every 100 females age 18 and over, there were 83.5 males.

The median income for a household in the village was $30,970, and the median income for a family was $36,538. Males had a median income of $32,470 versus $21,699 for females. The per capita income for the village was $15,237. 17.2% of the population and 14.9% of families were below the poverty line. Out of the total people living in poverty, 27.3% are under the age of 18 and 5.8% are 65 or older.

See also 
 Riverview, St. Louis, a neighborhood in adjoining City of St. Louis

References 

Villages in St. Louis County, Missouri
Villages in Missouri
Missouri populated places on the Mississippi River